The Sacramento Stealth were a collegiate woodbat baseball team based in Sacramento, California.  They are charter members of the Great West League.  They were owned by former Minor League Baseball and Japanese Baseball standout Leon Lee and were run by general manager Matt Lundgren (now GM of the Lincoln Potters).  Their head coach was Larry Wolfe.  The team played in the same city as the minor-league Sacramento River Cats of the Pacific Coast League, but share no affiliation, and the Sacramento Heat of the Golden State Collegiate Baseball League.

They were to have played their home games at historic Renfree Field in Sacramento, but the field was not quite ready for on-field play due to stalled talks about renovating the field for future use by amateur and high school teams.  So the league decided to make the Stealth a traveling team for the 2016 season.  Plans were set to make the field ready for play in 2017, but the team has since gone dormant.

Staff
 Leon Lee - Owner
 TBD - General Manager
 Larry Wolfe - Field Manager (Head Coach)
 Eddie Cervantes - Assistant Coach
 Danny Royster  - Director of Baseball Operations

References

External links
 Sacramento Stealth official website
 Great West League website

Amateur baseball teams in California
Baseball teams in Sacramento, California
2015 establishments in California
College baseball leagues in the United States